John Patterson Bryan Maxwell (September 3, 1804, Flemington, New Jersey - November 14, 1845, Belvidere, New Jersey) was an American Whig Party politician who represented New Jersey in the United States House of Representatives from 1837 to 1839 and again from 1841 to 1843.

He was the son of George C. Maxwell and the first cousin of George M. Robeson, both of whom also served in the House of Representatives.

Early life and career
Maxwell was born on September 3, 1804 in Flemington, New Jersey. He graduated from Princeton College in 1823, studied law, was admitted to the bar in 1827 and commenced practice in Newark, New Jersey. He moved to Belvidere, New Jersey and became editor of the Belvidere Apollo.

Congress
Maxwell was elected as a Whig to the Twenty-fifth Congress, serving from March 4, 1837 – March 3, 1839. He presented credentials as a Member-elect to the Twenty-sixth Congress, but the House declined to seat him. He was elected to the Twenty-seventh Congress, in office from March 4, 1841 – March 3, 1843. He was a trustee of Princeton College from 1842 to 1845. Maxwell died in Belvidere on November 14, 1845, and was interred there in Belvidere Cemetery.

Sources

John Patterson Bryan Maxwell at The Political Graveyard

1804 births
1845 deaths
New Jersey lawyers
People from Belvidere, New Jersey
People from Flemington, New Jersey
Princeton University alumni
Burials in New Jersey
Whig Party members of the United States House of Representatives from New Jersey
19th-century American politicians
19th-century American lawyers